Jeff Warner is a guitarist who is known for playing for the band Black 'N Blue. According to the liner notes of Black 'N Blue's Ultimate Collection, he replaced another guitarist, named Virgil Ripper, who was briefly in Black 'N Blue in the same slot that Jeff Warner was later in (that of being co-guitarist with Tommy Thayer).

References 

Living people
Black 'n Blue members
Place of birth missing (living people)
1962 births